Norway participated in the Eurovision Song Contest 2011 in Düsseldorf, Germany, selecting their entry through the national final Melodi Grand Prix 2011, organised by the Norwegian broadcaster, Norsk Rikskringkasting (NRK).

Before Eurovision

Melodi Grand Prix 2011 
Melodi Grand Prix 2011 was the 49th edition of the Norwegian national final Melodi Grand Prix and selected Norway's entry for the Eurovision Song Contest 2011. The competition consisted of three semi-finals, a Last Chance round and a final in different cities across Norway, hosted by Anne Rimmen and Per Sundnes. The shows were televised on NRK1 as well as streamed online at NRK's official website nrk.no. The final was also broadcast online at the official Eurovision Song Contest website eurovision.tv.

Format 
The competition consisted of five shows: three semi-finals on 15, 22 and 29 January 2011, the Last Chance (Siste sjansen) round on 5 February 2011 and a final on 12 February 2011. Seven songs competed in each semi-final and the top two entries proceeded directly to the final, while the songs that placed third and fourth proceeded to the Last Chance round. The two fifth-placed acts from the semi-finals with the most votes also proceeded to the Last Chance round as wildcards. An additional two entries qualified from the Last Chance round to the final. The results in the semi-finals and Last Chance round were determined exclusively by public televoting. The results in the final were determined by public televoting and four regional juries.

Competing entries 
A submission period was opened by NRK between 3 July 2010 and 15 September 2010. Songwriters of any nationality were allowed to submit entries, while NRK reserved the right to choose the performers of the selected songs in consultation with the songwriters and directly invite certain artists and composers to compete in addition to the public call for submissions. At the close of the deadline, 700 submissions were received. Twenty-one songs were selected for the competition by a jury panel consisting of Per Sundnes (Melodi Grand Prix music producer) and Mattias Carlsson (choreographer). Nine of the competing acts and songs were revealed on 22 November 2010 during a press conference at the Hard Rock Café in Oslo, presented by Per Sundnes. The remaining competing acts were revealed on 29 November 2010.

Semi-finals
Three semi-finals took place on 15, 22 and 29 January 2011, held at Hangar E of the Ørland Hovedflystasjon in Brekstad, the Florø Idrettssenter in Florø, and the Fritidspark in Skien. Seven songs competed in each semi-final; the top two entries as determined by public televoting proceeded directly to the final, while the songs that placed third and fourth proceeded to the Second Chance round. The two fifth-placed acts from the semi-finals with the most votes also proceeded to the Second Chance round as wildcards; these two songs were announced on 31 January 2011.

Last Chance round 
The Last Chance (Siste sjansen) round took place on 5 February 2011 at the Sparta Amfi in Sarpsborg. The six entries that placed third and fourth in the preceding four semi-finals alongside the two wildcards competed and the results were determined over two rounds of voting. In the first round, the eight entries competed in four duels and the winners of each duel were selected to proceed to the second round. In the second round, the four entries competed in two duels and the winners of each duel proceeded to the final.

Final 
Eight songs consisting of the six semi-final qualifiers alongside two qualifiers from the Last Chance round competed during the final on 12 February 2011 at the Oslo Spektrum in Oslo. The winner was selected over two rounds of voting. In the first round, the top four entries were selected by public televoting to proceed to the second round, the Gold Final. In the Gold Final, four regional juries from the four semi-final and Last Chance round host cities awarded 2,000, 4,000, 6,000 and 8,000 points to their top four songs. The results of the public televote and the audience in the Spektrum were revealed by Norway's regions and added to the jury scores, leading to the victory of "Haba Haba" performed by Stella Mwangi with 280,217 votes. In addition to the performances of the competing entries, the interval acts featured a performance by 2010 Norwegian Eurovision entrant Didrik Solli-Tangen.

At Eurovision 
Norway competed in the first semi-final of the contest, on 10 May, performing second on the night, after Poland's Magdalena Tul and before Aurela Gaçe from Albania. Stella did not qualify, placing 17th with 30 points. The public awarded Norway 9th place with 56 points and the jury awarded 17th place with 29 points.

Voting

Points awarded to Norway

Points awarded by Norway

References

External links
 Melodi Grand Prix official website
Full national final on nrk.no

2011
Countries in the Eurovision Song Contest 2011
2011
Eurovision
Eurovision